The 1893 Western Maryland Green Terror football team was an American football team that represented Western Maryland College (now known as McDaniel College) as an independent during the 1893 college football season. It was the third season in school history.

Schedule

References

Western Maryland
McDaniel Green Terror football seasons
Western Maryland Green Terror football